Uštica is a village in central Croatia, in the municipality of Jasenovac, Sisak-Moslavina County. It is connected by the D47 highway.

History

Demographics
According to the 2011 census, the village of Uštica has 177 inhabitants. This represents 38.15% of its pre-war population.

By 1991 census, 234 of its residents were ethnic Serbs (50.43%), 213 were ethnic Croats (45.90%), 6 were Yugoslavs (1.29%), 1 was Muslim (0.21%), 1 Montenegrin (0.21%) and 9 were of other ethnic origin (1.93%).

Sights 
 Monument and memorial to the victims of the Jasenovac concentration camp

Notable natives and residents

References

Populated places in Sisak-Moslavina County
Serb communities in Croatia